Jonathan Bruce "Jon" Kreft (born October 21, 1986) is an American professional basketball player, most recently for the CBA (China Basketball Association) and NBL of China (National Basketball League) formerly for the OSK R Airlines of the Thailand Basketball League. He played college basketball for Chipola College and Florida State University.

College statistics

|-
| style="text-align:left;"| 2010–11
| style="text-align:left;"| Florida State
| 25 || 0 || 9.8 || .475 || .000 || .511 || 2.3 || .3 || .2 || .4 || 3.2
|-
| style="text-align:left;"| 2011–12
| style="text-align:left;"| Florida State
| 35 || 0 || 10.3 || .464 || .000 || .741 || 2.3 || .2 || .3 || .6 || 2.8
|-

Professional career
After going undrafted in the 2012 NBA draft, Kreft joined the Memphis Grizzlies for the 2012 NBA Summer League. On September 12, 2012, he signed with Tsmoki-Minsk of Belarus for the 2012–13 season. In November 2012, he left after three games.

In August 2013, he signed with the Kelantan Warriors for the 2013 Malaysia National Basketball League season. On November 1, 2013, he was selected in the second round of the 2013 NBA D-League draft by the Santa Cruz Warriors. Three days later, he was traded to the Tulsa 66ers.

In June 2016, Kreft was signed by OSK R Airlines of the Thailand Basketball League.

NBA D-League career statistics

Regular season

|-
| align="left" | 2013–14
| align="left" | Tulsa 66ers
| 40 || 8 || 11.2 || .485 || .000 || .841 || 2.8 || .4 || .3 || .6 || 3.4
|-
| align="left" | Career
| align="left" | 
| 40 || 8 || 11.2 || .485 || .000 || .841 || 2.8 || .4 || .3 || .6 || 3.4

Personal
Kreft is the son of Paula and Bruce Kreft. His older brother, Dan, played college basketball at Northwestern from 1994 to 1996. He also has a younger brother, Mike, who served in the U.S. Army and played football at Valdosta State University from 2012 to 2013.

References

External links
Florida State Seminoles bio
NBA D-League Profile

1986 births
Living people
American expatriate basketball people in Belarus
American expatriate basketball people in Malaysia
American expatriate basketball people in Thailand
American men's basketball players
Basketball players from Florida
BC Tsmoki-Minsk players
Centers (basketball)
Chipola Indians men's basketball players
Florida State Seminoles men's basketball players
Osaka Evessa players
Sportspeople from Coral Springs, Florida
Tulsa 66ers players